Vereen M. Bell (5 October 1911 – 26 October 1944) was an American novelist and naval officer, who was killed in action during World War II.

Early life
Born in Cairo, Georgia to Jennie Vereen and (Judge) Reason Chesnutt Bell, Vereen Bell attended public schools before graduating from Davidson College in North Carolina in 1932.

Career
After writing several short stories and editing magazines, Bell wrote the novel Swamp Water, set in the Okefenokee Swamp. It was originally published in 1940 as a serial in the Saturday Evening Post. The novel was successfully adapted as a film (B&W) of the same title in 1941 and again as a color film, Lure of the Wilderness, in 1952.

Bell continued writing while serving in the Navy in World War II. The working title of his last work was The Renegade Queen.

Death
In World War II Bell was a lieutenant assigned as an intelligence officer to Composite Squadron VC-10 aboard the USS Gambier Bay, an escort carrier. In the Battle off Samar, on 25 October 1944, the Gambier Bay was part of a task force attacked by Vice Admiral Takeo Kurita's "Center Force". Bell rushed to the ready room to put on his flying gear but was ordered by the VC-10 commander, Lt. Cdr. Edward Huxtable, to remain on board. Bell survived the sinking of the Gambier Bay that morning but succumbed to exposure and delirium sometime during the evening of the 26th.

Legacy
Named for Bell is the "Vereen Bell Highway" in Ware County, Georgia.

Davidson College today awards the Vereen Bell Award for creative writing in his honor.

References 

 short article and photo

Further reading
Vereen Bell, Brag Dog and Other Stories: The Best of Vereen Bell, Belgrade, Mont., Wilderness Adventures Press, 2000.
Alexander Sesonske, "Jean Renoir in Georgia: Swamp Water," Georgia Review 26 (Spring 1982), pp 24–66.

20th-century American novelists
Novelists from Georgia (U.S. state)
United States Navy personnel killed in World War II
United States Navy officers
Davidson College alumni
1911 births
1944 deaths
American male novelists
20th-century American male writers
People from Cairo, Georgia